The Menominee County Courthouse is a government building located on Tenth Avenue between Eighth and Tenth Streets in Menominee, Michigan.  It was listed on the National Register of Historic Places in 1975 and designated a Michigan State Historic Site in 1974.

History

Menominee County was created in 1863, and included at the time the land that now covers Menominee, Iron, and Dickinson Counties.  The county seat was established in Menominee, and a clerk's office and jail were quickly built.  In 1874, county residents decided to build a courthouse, and bonds were sold to fund the construction.  A new plot of land in Menominee was found and purchased for the courthouse, and Chicago architect Gurdon P. Randall was hired to design the new building.  Contractors Cummings and Hagan were hired to build the courthouse, and construction began in 1874. The building was completed in 1875 at a cost of $29,680.  The building originally housed a jail on the first floor, county offices on the second floor, and the courtroom on the third floor.

Additions to the building were completed in 1909 and 1938.  The original connected jail and sheriff's residence were demolished later in the 20th century, but the courthouse itself was renovated in the early 1980s.

Description
The Menominee County Courthouse is a three-story Classical Revival building constructed of red brick, sitting on a rock-faced ashlar basement.  The exterior walls are load-bearing, while the interior walls, floors, and roof are constructed of wood.  Additional reinforcing of concrete and steel has been added during renovations. The building is ornamented with stone quoins and beltcourses separating the two upper stories. A hip roof with a belfry and wooden cupola tops the courthouse. The building has four symmetrical facades, each with slightly projected pavilions topped by triangular pediments.  The entrance facade has a projecting foyer which was added to the building at a later date.

With additions, the current courthouse houses 20,000 square feet of space.

References

External links

Menominee County official page: courthouse history

Government buildings completed in 1875
Buildings and structures in Menominee County, Michigan
Michigan State Historic Sites
County courthouses in Michigan
Courthouses on the National Register of Historic Places in Michigan
Neoclassical architecture in Michigan
National Register of Historic Places in Menominee County, Michigan